Lutheran schools in the United States are educational institutions set up under or affiliated with various Lutheran synods. These synods are not affiliated with each other and vary in their doctrinal beliefs. Most of the Lutheran schools are associated with the Lutheran Church–Missouri Synod (LCMS), the Wisconsin Evangelical Lutheran Synod (WELS), the Evangelical Lutheran Church in America (ELCA), or the Lutheran Congregations in Mission for Christ (LCMC). Lutheran schools generally attempt to place practicing Lutherans and practicing Christians of other Christian traditions first in enrollments. This is in contrast to other Christian educational institutions, such as Anglican schools, which take into account other non-religious criteria.

Primary education
The following is a list of Lutheran elementary schools in the United States for which Wikipedia articles exist:

California

 Ramona - Ramona Lutheran School (LCMS)
 Venice - First Lutheran School of Venice (LCMS)

Florida

 Orlando - Trinity Lutheran School (LCMS)

Illinois

 Chicago - Pilgrim Lutheran School (ELCA)

Indiana 

 Evansville - Evansville Lutheran School (LCMS)
 Lafayette - Saint James Lutheran School (LCMS)

Kansas 

 Topeka - Topeka Lutheran School {LCMS}

Maryland 

 Hardford County - Trinity Lutheran Christian School

Michigan 

 New Boston - St. John's Lutheran School (LCMS)

Missouri 

 Kansas City - Martin Luther Academy (LCMS)
 Perryville - Immanuel Lutheran School (LCMS)

New York 

 Walmore - St. Peter's Lutheran School (LCMC)

Ohio 

 Milford - Saint Mark's Lutheran School (LCMS)

Oregon 

 Bend - Trinity Lutheran School (LCMS)

Virginia 

 Newport News - Trinity Lutheran School (ELCA)

Wisconsin 

 Mayville - Immanuel Lutheran School (LCMS)
 Milwaukee - St. Martini Lutheran School (LCMS)

Secondary education
This is a list of Lutheran high schools by state and city.

Arizona
 Phoenix - Arizona Lutheran Academy (WELS)
 Phoenix - North Valley Christian Academy High School (LCMS)
 Phoenix - Valley Lutheran High School (LCMS)
 Whiteriver - East Fork High School (WELS)

California
 Canoga Park - Trinity Lutheran High School
 Chula Vista - Victory Christian Academy (LCMS)
 
 
 Irvine - Crean Lutheran High School (LCMS)
 La Verne - Lutheran High School-La Verne (LCMS)
 Orange - Lutheran High School of Orange County (LCMS)
 
 Sylmar - Concordia High School (formerly LA Lutheran Middle/Senior High School)
 Torrance - Pacific Lutheran High School (LCMS)
 Wildomar - California Lutheran High School (Boarding School) (WELS)

Colorado
 Commerce City- Rocky Mountain Lutheran High School (WELS)
 Edwards - Vail Christian High School (LCMS)
 Parker - Lutheran High School (LCMS)

Florida
 Deerfield Beach - Zion Lutheran Christian School
 Doral - Divine Savior Lutheran Academy (WELS)
 Mulberry - Calvary Academy (boarding school)
 Ocala - St John Lutheran High School (LCMS)
 Sanford - Holy Cross Lutheran Academy (LCMS)

Hawaii

Illinois
 Buckley - Christ Lutheran High School (LCMS)
 Centralia - Christ Our Rock Lutheran High School (LCMS)
 Chicago - New Luther High School
 Crete - Illinois Lutheran High School (WELS)
 Crystal Lake - Faith Lutheran High School (LCMS)
 Decatur - Lutheran School Association High School (LCMS)
 Edwardsville - Metro East Lutheran High School (LCMS)
 Elgin - Fox Valley Lutheran Academy
 Evansville - Christ Our Savior Lutheran High School (LCMS)
 Lansing - Luther East High School
 Melrose Park - Walther Christian Academy (LCMS)
 Plainfield - Christ Lutheran Academy
 Rockford - Lutheran High School (LCMS, ELCA)
 Springfield - Lutheran High School (LCMS)
 Sterling - Christ Lutheran School

Indiana
 Fort Wayne - Concordia Lutheran High School (LCMS)
 Indianapolis - Lutheran High School of Indianapolis (LCMS)
 Seymour - Trinity Lutheran High School (LCMS)

Iowa
 Cedar Falls - Valley Lutheran High School (LCMS)
 Scarville - Scarville Lutheran School (SLS)

Louisiana
 Metairie - Lutheran High School (LCMS)

Maryland
 Towson - Concordia Preparatory School (LCMS)

Michigan
 
 Holt - Martin Luther High School (LCMS)
 Macomb - Lutheran High School North (LCMS)
 
 Rochester Hills - Lutheran High School Northwest (LCMS)
 Saginaw - Michigan Lutheran Seminary (Boarding School) (WELS)
 Saginaw - Valley Lutheran High School (LCMS)
 Saint Joseph - Michigan Lutheran High School (WELS)
 Westland - Lutheran High School Westland (LCMS)
 Wyoming - West Michigan Lutheran High School (LCMS)

Minnesota
 Bloomington Lion's Gate Christian Academy
 Fergus Falls - Hillcrest Lutheran Academy (Board School)
 Lakefield - Sioux Valley Lutheran Secondary School
 Mankato - Immanuel Lutheran High School (Church of the Lutheran Confession)
 Mayer - Lutheran High School (LCMS)
 Morristown - Cannon Valley Lutheran High School
 New Ulm - Minnesota Valley Lutheran High School (WELS)
 Northrop - Martin Luther High School (LCMS)
 Plymouth - West Lutheran High School (WELS)
 Roseville - Concordia Academy (LCMS)
 West Saint Paul - St. Croix Lutheran High School (WELS)
 Winona - Hope Lutheran High School (LCMS)

Missouri
 Concordia - Saint Paul Lutheran High School (Boarding School) (LCMS)
 Jackson - Saxony Lutheran High School (LCMS)
 Jefferson City - Calvary Lutheran High School (LCMS)
 Kansas City - Lutheran High School of Kansas City (LCMS)
 Saint Louis - Lutheran High School North (LCMS)
 Saint Louis - Lutheran High School South (LCMS)
 Saint Peters - Lutheran High School of Saint Charles County (LCMS)

Nebraska
 Grand Island - Heartland Lutheran High School (LCMS)
 Lincoln - Lincoln Lutheran Middle/Sr High School (LCMS)
 Norfolk - Lutheran High Northeast (LCMS)
 Omaha - Concordia Junior Senior High School (LCMS)
 Waco - Nebraska Evangelical Lutheran High School (Boarding School) (WELS)

Nevada
 Carson City - Sierra Lutheran High School (LCMS)
 Las Vegas - Faith Lutheran Middle School & High School (LCMS)

New York
 Bronx - Our Saviour Lutheran High School (LCMS)
 Brookville - Long Island Lutheran Middle and High School (LCMS)
 Centereach - Our Savior New American School (LCMS)
 Maspeth - Martin Luther High School (LCMS)

North Carolina
 Charlotte - Charlotte United Christian Academy

North Dakota
 Fargo - Oak Grove Lutheran High School (ELCA)

Ohio
 Cleveland Heights - Lutheran High School East (LCMS)
 Rocky River - Lutheran High School West (LCMS)

Oklahoma
 Broken Arrow - Immanuel Lutheran Christian Academy (LCMS)

Oregon
 Bend - Trinity Lutheran School (LCMS)
 Portland - Portland Lutheran High School (LCMS) - Closed 2015

Pennsylvania
 Verona - Redeemer Lutheran School (LCMS)

Puerto Rico
 Bayamon - Colegio Santisima Trinidad

South Dakota
 Rapid City - Black Hills Lutheran School (LCMS)
 Sioux Falls - Lutheran High School of Sioux Falls (LCMS)
 Watertown - Great Plains Lutheran High School (Boarding School) (WELS)

Texas
 Austin - Concordia High School (LCMS)
 Carrollton - Prince of Peace Christian School (LCMS)
 Dallas - Dallas Lutheran School (LCMS)
 Ft Worth - St Paul Lutheran School-6th to 8th grade
 Houston - Lutheran High School North (LCMS)
 Houston - Lutheran South Academy (LCMS)
 Plano - Faith Lutheran High School (LCMS)
 San Antonio - Lutheran High School of San Antonio (LCMS)
 Tomball - Concordia Lutheran High School (LCMS)

Utah
 Riverton - Concordia Preparatory School, formerly known as Salt Lake Lutheran High School (LCMS) - Closed 2015

Washington
 Seattle - Seattle Lutheran High School (LCMS)
 Tacoma - Evergreen Lutheran High School (WELS)
 Tacoma - Concordia Christian Academy  (LCMS)

Wisconsin
 Appleton - Fox Valley Lutheran High School (WELS)
 Cecil - Wolf River Lutheran High School (LCMS)
 Eau Claire - Immanuel Lutheran College High School (Church of the Lutheran Confession)
 Fond du Lac - Winnebago Lutheran Academy (WELS)
 Green Bay - Northeastern Wisconsin Lutheran High School (LCMS)
 Greendale - Martin Luther High School (LCMS)
 Hartland - Lake Country Lutheran High School (LCMS)
 Jackson - Kettle Moraine Lutheran High School (WELS)
 Jackson - Living Word Lutheran High School (LCMS)
 Kronenwetter - Northland Lutheran High School (WELS)
 Lake Mills - Lakeside Lutheran High School (WELS)
 Manitowoc - Manitowoc Lutheran High School (WELS)
 Milwaukee - Lutheran High School (LCMS & WELS), split in 1955 to form:
 Milwaukee - Milwaukee Lutheran High School (LCMS)
 Milwaukee - Wisconsin Lutheran High School (WELS)
 Mosinee - Wisconsin Valley Lutheran High School (LCMS)
 Onalaska - Luther High School (WELS)
 Racine - Racine Lutheran High School (LCMS)
 Sheboygan - Sheboygan Lutheran High School (LCMS)
 Somers - Shoreland Lutheran High School (WELS)
 Watertown - Luther Preparatory School (Boarding School) (WELS)

Post-secondary education

References

See also
 List of Lutheran schools in Australia
 List of schools in the United States
 List of Baptist schools in the United States
 List of independent Catholic schools in the United States
 List of international schools in the United States

Lutheran
Lists of religious schools in the United States